William Sandford Pakenham-Walsh (Pinyin: Wàn Báwén; Foochow Romanized: Uâng Bĕk-ùng; 1868 – April 26, 1960) was a Christian clergyman, educationalist and writer. He was most famous for his work Tudor Story.

Life 

W. S. Pakenham-Walsh was born in 1868 into a distinguished Irish clerical family. His middle name, Sandford, was given to him by his father who used to work as curate and later Rector of Sandford Parish in Dublin.

In 1897, W. S. Pakenham-Walsh went to China under the auspices of CMS to work with the Dublin University Fukien Mission as Chaplain to the British community in Foochow, where he labored as a pastor of St. John's Church in Cangshan. In 1907, he opened "St. Mark's Anglo-Chinese College", later known as Foochow Trinity College, today the Fuzhou Foreign Language School. W. S. Pakenham-Walsh retired in 1919, but he remained in China until 1921. On his return to England he became Vicar of Sulgrave, Northamptonshire, and also a keen scholar and educationalist.

W. S. Pakenham-Walsh's most notable work is his Tudor Story that he completed at age 90. His strong interest in Anne Boleyn began in 1917 during his missionary trip in Foochow, when he found in the Foochow British Community Library books related to Anne Boleyn's life. Since then W. S. Pakenham-Walsh had been compiling a summary of her life. Motivated by his desire to unveil the true Anne Boleyn, he claimed to have experienced a series of spiritual experiences following a prayer at Boleyn's burial site that she might become his guardian angel, which led him to seek clairvoyants who helped to channel the spirit of Anne Boleyn. In his diary he said that for 30 years he had been in constant touch with King Henry VIII, Anne Boleyn, and other figures of the Tudor Court.

W. S. Pakenham-Walsh died on 26 April 1960.

Selected works 
 Some Typical Christians of South China (1905)
 Nestorius and the Nestorian Mission in China (1908)
 Chants in War (1916)
 Anne Boleyn: or, The queen of May – A Play in Four Acts (1921)
 Three Medical Missionaries: in Memoriam (1922)
 The Church of St. James, Sulgrave (Notes on Famous Churches and Abbeys) (1925)
 Fifty Miles Around Sulgrave (1929)
 Through Cloud and Sunshine (1932)
 Twenty Years in China (1935)
 A Tudor Story: The Return of Anne Boleyn (1963),

References 

1868 births
1960 deaths
Anglican writers
Anglican missionaries in China
Christian missionaries in Fujian
Irish Anglican missionaries
British Anglican missionaries
British expatriates in China